Oat milk is a plant milk derived from whole oat (Avena spp.) grains by extracting the plant material with water. Oat milk has a creamy texture and mild oatmeal-like flavor, and is manufactured in various flavors, such as sweetened, unsweetened, vanilla, and chocolate.

Unlike other plant milks having origins as early as the 13th century, oat milk was developed in the 1990s by the Swedish scientist Rickard Öste. Over 2017–2019, oat milk sales in the United States increased 10 fold, and one major manufacturer, Oatly, reported a three-fold increase in worldwide sales. As of late 2020, the oat milk market became second-largest among plant milks in the United States, following the leader, almond milk, but exceeding the sales of soy milk.

By 2020, oat milk products included coffee creamer, yogurt alternatives, ice cream, and chocolate. Oat milk may be consumed to replace dairy in vegan diets, or in cases of medical conditions where dairy is incompatible, such as lactose intolerance or an allergy to cow milk. Compared to milk and other plant-based beverages, oat milk has relatively low environmental impact due to its comparatively low land and water needs for production.

History

Invention
Soy milk and almond milk predate all other alternative milks, including oat milk, both as cultural and commercial products. Since the early 20th century, soy milk made its way from Asia to European and American grocery stores, initially as a dairy substitute due to lactose intolerance. The increase in consumption of soy milk since its global distribution created a large market for plant-based beverages like oat milk. The first recorded instance of an oat-based plant beverage was in the early 1990s, when Rickard Öste developed oat milk. Öste was working as a food scientist at Lund University in Lund, Sweden, researching lactose intolerance and sustainable food systems, when he invented the drink. Soon after, Öste founded Oatly, the first commercial manufacturer of oat milk.

History of market expansion 
The pioneer in commercial oat milk, Oatly, had its products in 7,000 coffee shops and grocery stores, as of 2019, but was not the only prominent oat milk producer. Oat milk can be found under brand names Oatly (Sweden), Pureharvest (Australia), Alpro (UK), Bioavena (Italy), Simpli (Finland), Vitasoy (Hong Kong), and Pacific (USA), among others. In 2018, global sales of plant milks, including oat milk, were US$1.6 billion, with a forecast of $41 billion by 2025.

In 2018, there were numerous oat milk shortages from unprecedented demand in Europe and North America, highlighting the strong consumer demand for this product. In 2019, retail sales of oat milk in the United States were $29 million, up from $4.4 million in 2017. During 2020, oat milk sales in the United States increased to $213 million, becoming the second most consumed plant milk after almond milk ($1.5 billion in 2020 sales).

Oat milk ice cream, yogurt-like products, and coffee creamers, were common in 2019, with expanded uses in coffee shops, such as Starbucks, and growth into new markets, such as China. Growth in the oat milk market is partly attributed to its relatively low environmental impact, low land and water needs, and rising vegan dietary practices in developed countries.

From 2019 to 2020 in the United States, oat milk sales increased 303% to  million, with refrigerated oat milk having nearly ten times the sales of shelf-stable oat milk. Consumer analysis of the growth in oat milk consumption indicates its market growth derives from the dairy-like taste, health perception, and environmental sustainability, which contrasts with the high water demand of growing almonds. Oat milk foams and mixes in other beverages, like coffee, in ways similar to milk.
Over 2020-21, oat milk sales increased 151%, with it becoming the second-most consumed plant milk after almond milk. On 20 May 2021, Oatly  the world's largest oat milk manufacturer  became a publicly traded company on the NASDAQ exchange, having a market value of 13 billion on that day.

Production

Processing 
The production of oat milk is similar to that of most other plant milks. Unprocessed cereal grains, like oats, are indigestible due to their hard, outer hull; processing is also necessary to change the dry grains into a liquid.

The procedure starts by measuring and milling the oat grains to break apart their outer hull. Then the grains are stirred in warm water and ground into a slurry. The slurry is treated with enzymes and heat to create a thick liquid oat base.

Soaking and subsequently extracting nutrients from the oats have the most direct implications on the final milk product. Increasing the yield in this step may be assisted by chemical catalysts, enzymes, or an increase in temperature, all in order to remove nutrient molecules from the solid byproduct and incorporate them into the liquid. Chemical catalysts increase the pH of the mixture, enzymatic catalysts induce partial hydrolysis of proteins and polysaccharides, and higher temperatures increase reaction rates. Separating the liquid from the solid byproduct is a simple step achieved through decanting, filtration, and spinning in a centrifuge.

Once the liquid product is separated, adding other ingredients, such as fortifying vitamins and minerals, or sweeteners, flavorings, salts, oils, and similar ingredients, forms the final product. Since unfortified oat milk is lower in calcium, iron, and vitamin A than milk, these nutrients must be added in order for the end product to be a nutritional substitute of milk. Homogenization and heat-treatments such as pasteurization or ultra-high temperature (UHT) treatments are used to extend the product's shelf life.

Challenges to processing 
Oat milk, like most plant-based milks, is made of disintegrated and hydrolyzed plant materials, resulting in non-uniform particle sizes in comparison to bovine milk. Decreasing particle size and narrowing the distribution through physical processing like homogenization, and using stabilizers, such as hydrocolloids in combination with other emulsifiers, are common ways to improve product quality.

Another problem posed by the natural composition of oats is their high starch content. The starch content (50–60%) is challenging during ultra-high temperature treatments because of the relatively low gelatinization temperature of starch. To overcome this, producers use an enzymatic hydrolysis of starch by alpha- and beta-amylase, which break down the starch into smaller polysaccharides without the previous gelatinization behavior.

Fortifying oat milk with essential micronutrients may include vitamin D, vitamin A, vitamin B12, riboflavin, and calcium.

Veganism and environmental impact
Since around 2015, interest for plant-based foods, in combination with concerns for animal welfare and low environmental impact, propelled consumption of oat milk. Compared to milk and other plant-based milks, the oat milk manufacturing process produces small amounts of carbon dioxide and no methane (low greenhouse gas emissions), and requires relatively low use of water and land. Oat milk production requires 1/15th the amount of water of milk production and 1/8th the water of almond milk.

Nutritional composition

In comparison to cow's milk, oat milk is similar in total calories per liquid volume (per cup serving, 120 vs 149 calories for cow's milk), has 40% the protein content, 63% of the fat, but only about 10% of the saturated fat content, and about 1.5 times the total carbohydrate (although simple sugars are half that of cow's milk). Cow's milk has no fiber, but oat milk has 2 g dietary fiber per serving. Calcium and potassium contents are comparable, although oat milk – as for all plant-based milks – may be fortified with specific nutrients during manufacturing. It has a glycemic index of 60; cow's milk is 47.

Uses 
Oat milk is used as a substitute for milk in custom coffee preparation, and in fermented products similar to yogurt and kefir. Baristas claim that oat milk needs less steam than cow milk, froths favorably, is tasteful, rich, and creamy like cow milk, and effectively balances the acidity of espresso coffee. It has growing applications in coffee preparation at major coffee shops.

See also
Almond milk
Coconut milk
Plant milk
Pea milk
Soy milk

References

Cold drinks
Milk substitutes
Non-alcoholic drinks
Oats
Plant milk
Vegan cuisine
Vegetarianism and drinks
Grains